Chandrasekhar–Page equations describe the wave function of the spin-½ massive particles, that resulted by seeking a separable solution to the Dirac equation in Kerr metric or Kerr–Newman metric. In 1976, Subrahmanyan Chandrasekhar showed that a separable solution can be obtained from the Dirac equation in Kerr metric. Later, Don Page extended this work to Kerr–Newman metric, that is applicable to charged black holes. In his paper, Page notices that N. Toop also derived his results independently, as informed to him by Chandrasekhar.

By assuming a normal mode decomposition of the form  for the time and the azimuthal component of the spherical polar coordinates , Chandrasekhar showed that the four bispinor components can be expressed as product of radial and angular functions.

Chandrasekhar–Page angular equations 

The angular functions satisfy the coupled eigenvalue equations,

where

Eliminating  between the foregoing two equations, one obtains

The eigenvalue problem presented here in general requires numerical integrations for it to be solved. Explicit solutions are available for the case where .

References

Spinors
Black holes
Ordinary differential equations